HD 4747 is a star that lies approximately 61 light-years away in the constellation of Cetus. The star is a low-amplitude spectroscopic binary, with the secondary being a directly detected brown dwarf.

Binarity
The binarity of HD 4747 was announced in 2002, based on observations with the HIRES spectrograph at the W. M. Keck Observatory. The radial velocity variation caused by the companion was found to have a semi-amplitude of approximately 0.65 km/s, which evaded detection by earlier spectrographs due to their precision being poorer than about 1 km/s, but was easily detectable by the 3 m/s precision of HIRES. With a period of 6832 ± 653 days (the large error due to the orbit being unclosed over 1731 day span of observations) and an eccentricity of 0.64 ± 0.06, assuming a primary mass of  led to a minimum secondary mass of  - well within the brown dwarf regime. HD 4747 B became one of the few brown dwarf candidates orbiting within a few AU of any type of star.

An updated orbital solution was provided in 2010, based on observations with the CORALIE spectrograph. With a 3068-day extension to the radial velocity time series, the orbital period was found to be about twice as long as previously thought due to an increase in the fitted eccentricity.

In 2013 an attempt to directly image the secondary using  adaptive optics imaging at the W. M. Keck Observatory resulted in a non-detection, thus effectively eliminating the possibility of the companion being a low inclination stellar binary. A follow up attempt in 2014 resulted in a candidate source that together with additional images taken in 2015 confirmed the companion as having common proper motion and also showed orbital motion in a counter-clockwise direction.

HD 4747B
Photometry indicates that HD 4747B is most likely a L-type brown dwarf and may possibly be close to the transition between L and T-types. A preliminary dynamical mass was found to be  times the mass of Jupiter.

References

Cetus (constellation)
004747
Spectroscopic binaries
G-type main-sequence stars
0036
003850
Durchmusterung objects
Brown dwarfs